The posterior wall may refer to:
 Acetabulum
 Mastoid wall of tympanic cavity
 The posterior wall of a cardiac ventricle